Plectoptera is a genus of cockroach in the family Ectobiidae. There are at least 2 described species in Plectoptera.

Species
 Plectoptera picta Saussure & Zehntner, 1893 (pictured beetle cockroach)
 Plectoptera poeyi (Saussure, 1862) (Florida beetle roach)

References

 Gutiérrez, Esteban (1995). "Annotated checklist of Cuban cockroaches". Transactions of the American Entomological Society, vol. 121, 65-84.
 Poole, Robert W., and Patricia Gentili, eds. (1997). "Blattodea". Nomina Insecta Nearctica: A Check List of the Insects of North America: vol. 4: Non-Holometabolous Orders, 31-39.

Further reading

 

Cockroaches